The 2001–02 Ukrainian First League was the eleventh season of the Ukrainian First League which was won by SC Volyn-1 Lutsk. The season started on July 17, 2001, and finished on June 16, 2002.

Promotion and relegation

Promoted teams
Three clubs promoted from the 2000–01 Ukrainian Second League.
Group A
 FC Polissya Zhytomyr – champion (returning after a season)
Group B
 FC Obolon Kyiv – champion (returning after a season)
Group C
 FC Naftovyk Okhtyrka – champion (returning after a season)

Relegated teams 
Two clubs were relegated from the 2000-01 Ukrainian Top League:
 FC Stal Alchevsk – 14th place (returning after a season)
 FC Nyva Ternopil – 15th place (debut)

Renamed teams
 FC Lviv merged with Karpaty becoming their farm team and changed its name to FC Karpaty-2 Lviv before the season.
 FC Metalurh Nikopol changed its name to FC Elektrometalurh-NZF Nikopol before the season.
 Due to reorganization of FC Arsenal Kyiv, FC CSKA-2 Kyiv changed its name back to FC CSKA Kyiv during winter break.

Teams
In 2001-02 season, the Ukrainian First League consists of the following teams:

Final table

Promotion play-off 

FC Polissya Zhytomyr failed to obtain a berth in the 2002–03 Vyshcha Liha.

Top scorers 
Statistics are taken from here.

See also
2001–02 Ukrainian Premier League
2001–02 Ukrainian Second League
2001–02 Ukrainian Cup

References

Ukrainian First League seasons
2001–02 in Ukrainian association football leagues
Ukra